Guo Jinlong (born July 1947) is a Chinese politician, who served as the Vice Chairman of the Central Guidance Commission on Building Spiritual Civilization, and was a member of the Politburo of the Chinese Communist Party. Between 2008 and 2012 Guo served as the Mayor of Beijing, and Communist Party Secretary of Beijing between 2012 and 2017. As the Mayor of Beijing during the 2008 Olympics, Guo served as the executive chairman of the Beijing Organizing Committee for the Olympic Games (BOCOG).

Before his career in Beijing, Guo served as the Party Secretary of the Tibet Autonomous Region between 2000 and 2004, and Party Secretary of Anhui Province from 2004 to 2007.

Life and career 
Guo Jinlong was born in Nanjing. He graduated from Nanjing University Department of Physics in 1969 and joined the Chinese Communist Party in 1979, and was sent to work as a technician in Zhong County, Sichuan (later made part of Chongqing municipality), at the local water works department. He also worked as a sports coach, a propaganda instructor, and head of the county education board, before being promoted to county governor. He then worked in the provincial agriculture research office. In 1987, he gained his first political office, as deputy party chief of Leshan, then in 1990 he was made party chief of Leshan.

In December 1993, Guo left Sichuan, where he had worked for over twenty years, and headed to Lhasa to serve as the Deputy Party Secretary of the Tibet Autonomous Region, and was promoted to become the Secretary from 2000 to 2004. As the leading official in Tibet at the time, Guo played a leading role in the Qinghai-Tibet Railway project.  

He left Tibet to serve as the party chief of Anhui province in 2004, and Chairman of the Standing Committee of Anhui People's Congress from 2005. In the first year in Anhui Guo and his family conducted work from a hotel. After the departure of Wang Qishan from his post as Mayor of Beijing, Guo headed north from Anhui to take over the position as Acting mayor on November 30, 2007, confirmed on January 26, 2008. He served as Executive President of the Beijing Organizing Committee for the 2008 Summer Olympics. On July 3, 2012, a few months before the 18th Party Congress, Guo was named party chief of Beijing. At the party congress held in November, Guo was elevated to the 25-member Politburo of the Chinese Communist Party. On May 27, 2017, Guo relinquished his post of Beijing party chief to Cai Qi. He was then duly appointed as the Vice Chairman of the Central Guidance Commission on Building Spiritual Civilization.

Guo was the alternate member of 15th CPC Central Committee and member of 16th, 17th, and 18th Central Committees. 

Due to age restrictions Guo retired at the 19th Party Congress in 2017.

References

External links 
 Biography of Guo Jinlong Xinhua News Agency  

1947 births
Living people
Nanjing University alumni
Politicians from Nanjing
People's Republic of China politicians from Jiangsu
Chinese Communist Party politicians from Jiangsu
Political office-holders in Anhui
Political office-holders in Tibet
Mayors of Beijing
Members of the 18th Politburo of the Chinese Communist Party
Members of the 16th Central Committee of the Chinese Communist Party
Members of the 17th Central Committee of the Chinese Communist Party
Presidents of the Organising Committees for the Olympic Games